

Hans-Heinrich Sixt von Armin (6 November 1890 – 1 April 1952) was a German general during World War II who commanded several divisions. He was a recipient of the Knight's Cross of the Iron Cross. Armin surrendered following the Battle of Stalingrad in 1943 and died in Soviet captivity on 1 April 1952. He was the son of World War I general Friedrich Bertram Sixt von Armin.

War crimes 
In July 1941, Armin had 200 Jews shot in Zhytomyr for allegedly abusing German soldiers.

Dates of rank
Major (1 April 1929)
Oberstleutnant (1 October 1932)
Oberst (1 October 1934)
Generalmajor (1 March 1938)
Generalleutnant (1 March 1940)

Awards and decorations

 Knight's Cross of the Iron Cross on 22 September 1941 as Generalleutnant and commander of 95. Infanterie-Division

References

Citations

Bibliography

 

1890 births
1952 deaths
Holocaust perpetrators in Ukraine
People from the Province of Pomerania
Lieutenant generals of the German Army (Wehrmacht)
German Army personnel of World War I
Prussian Army personnel
Recipients of the Gold German Cross
Recipients of the Knight's Cross of the Iron Cross
Recipients of the clasp to the Iron Cross, 1st class
German prisoners of war in World War II held by the Soviet Union
German people who died in Soviet detention
Military personnel from Szczecin
German commanders at the Battle of Stalingrad
Reichswehr personnel
German untitled nobility
German Army generals of World War II
Nazis who died in prison custody